Mucilaginibacter psychrotolerans is a psychrotolerant, Gram-negative and rod-shaped bacterium from the genus of Mucilaginibacter which has been isolated from the Riganqiao peatlands from the Tibetan Plateau.

References

External links
Type strain of Mucilaginibacter psychrotolerans at BacDive -  the Bacterial Diversity Metadatabase

Sphingobacteriia
Bacteria described in 2017